Hanover Township is one of the eighteen townships of Columbiana County, Ohio, United States. The 2010 census reported 3,704 people living in the township, 3,296 of whom were in the unincorporated portions of the township.

Hanover Township is home to the United Local School District campus.

Geography
Located in the western part of the county, it borders the following townships:
Butler Township - north
Salem Township - northeast corner
Center Township - east
Franklin Township - southeast
East Township, Carroll County - southwest
West Township - west
Knox Township - northwest corner

One village and two unincorporated communities are located in Hanover Township:
The village of Hanoverton, in the south
The unincorporated community of Kensington, in the southwest
The unincorporated community of Guilford, in the northeast

Name and history

Statewide, other Hanover townships are located in Butler, Ashland, and Licking counties. The township was organized in 1806.

Government
The township, governed by a three-member board of trustees, who are elected in November of odd-numbered years to a four-year term beginning on the following January 1. Two are elected in the year after the presidential election and one is elected in the year before it. There is also an elected township fiscal officer, who serves a four-year term beginning on April 1 of the year after the election, which is held in November of the year before the presidential election. Vacancies in the fiscal officership or on the board of trustees are filled by the remaining trustees.

Township Trustees
Jason T. Raymond, Chairman
John S. Zehentbauer, Vice Chairman
Robert L. Manfull

Fiscal Officer
Debra J. Blazer

Infrastructure
The township has many notable and famous pieces of infrastructure across it. Three main highways include Ohio State Route 9, Ohio State Route 172, and U.S. Route 30. The Hanoverton Canal Town District, a part of the Sandy and Beaver Canal, is part of the National Register of Historic Places.  Another piece of notable infrastructure includes the Tennessee Gas Pipeline, which runs from south to north through the township.

References

External links
County website

Townships in Columbiana County, Ohio
1806 establishments in Ohio
Townships in Ohio